End of Sentence is a 2019 drama film starring John Hawkes, Logan Lerman and Sarah Bolger and directed by Elfar Adalsteins. Upon its release, the movie received widespread critical acclaim.

Plot
Frank Fogle, a widower, reluctantly embarks on a journey to honour his wife's last wish of spreading her ashes in a remote lake in her native Ireland and a promise of taking his estranged son, Sean, along for the trip. As Sean steps out of prison the last thing on his mind is a foreign road trip with his alienated father. What he needs is a fresh start in the United States. But when his travel plans collapse he reluctantly accepts his father's proposal in return for a ticket to the West Coast and a promise that they never have to see each other again. Between a disconcerting Irish wake, the surfacing of an old flame, the pick up of a pretty hitchhiker and plenty of unresolved issues, the journey becomes a little more than father and son had bargained for.

Cast
John Hawkes as Frank Fogle
Logan Lerman as Sean Fogle
Sarah Bolger as Jewel
Ólafur Darri Ólafsson as Stone

Production
The film was shot in Ireland in May 2017.

References

External links
 

2019 films
American drama films
Irish drama films
Icelandic drama films
English-language Icelandic films
English-language Irish films
Films shot in Ireland
2019 drama films
2010s English-language films
2010s American films